Second Southwark Church Archeological Site is a historic archaeological site located near Surry, Surry County, Virginia.  The site includes the remains of the second church to serve Southwark Parish.  It is believed to have been erected by 1673, and replaced an earlier church built about 1655.  The church was abandoned shortly after the American Revolutionary War, and stood in ruins through the American Civil War.  A monument was erected on the site in 1927.  A Virginia highway marker commemorating the church site is located near the junction of Virginia Routes 10 and 618.

It was listed on the National Register of Historic Places in 1984.

References

Archaeological sites on the National Register of Historic Places in Virginia
National Register of Historic Places in Surry County, Virginia
Buildings and structures in Surry County, Virginia